Dial M is the eleventh full-length album by California-based Indie rock band Starflyer 59. The album was released on October 28, 2008 on compact disc through Tooth & Nail Records. A vinyl record version, containing an extra song, was released by Burnt Toast Vinyl.

Track listing

Bonus track
Magic
Only available on the vinyl and mp3 versions of the album

References

Starflyer 59 albums
Tooth & Nail Records albums
2008 albums